La Morandière is a former municipality in the Canadian province of Quebec, located in the Abitibi Regional County Municipality. In 2023 it merged with Rochebaucourt to from the new municipality of La Morandière-Rochebaucourt.

History
The location where La Morandière currently sits was initially settled in around 1916 by Émilien Plante, Uldéric Hardy and Charles Rochette but the territory didn't have any official status until January 1, 1983, the date when the municipality of La Morandière was founded.

Demographics
Population trend:
 Population in 2016: 207 (2011 to 2016 population change: -11.2%)
 Population in 2011: 233 (2006 to 2011 population change: -11.1%)
 Population in 2006: 262
 Population in 2001: 291
 Population in 1996: 295
 Population in 1991: 327

Mother tongue:
 English as first language: 0%
 French as first language: 95.2%
 English and French as first language: 0%
 Other as first language: 0%

References

Municipalities in Quebec
Incorporated places in Abitibi-Témiscamingue